Menophra abruptaria, the waved umber, is a moth of the family Geometridae. The species was first described by Carl Peter Thunberg in 1792. It is found in south-western North Africa, southern Europe and Anatolia; in the north, it is found from England to Switzerland and south-western Germany.
The wingspan is 36–42 mm. Adults are on wing from April to June. Normally, there is one generation per year, although there can be a partial second generation in summer.

The larvae feed on Ligustrum ovalifolium and Syringa vulgaris.

External links

Waved umber at UKMoths
Lepidoptera of Belgium
Lepiforum e.V.

Boarmiini
Moths of Europe
Moths of Asia
Taxa named by Carl Peter Thunberg